The 2019 Asia Pacific Women's Championship was a rugby union competition for women's national teams held in Lautoka, Fiji from 24 May to 1 June 2019. It was a single round-robin tournament contested by Fiji, Samoa and Hong Kong.  won the competition after going undefeated in both their matches.

Teams

Table

Tournament

References 

2019 in women's rugby union
2019 in Fijian rugby union
2019 in Samoan rugby union
Asia Pacific
Asia Pacific
Asia Pacific
Asia Pacific